Ansett New Zealand was an airline serving the New Zealand domestic market between 1987 and 2001. It was a subsidiary of Ansett Transport Industries. In order to comply with regulatory requirements relating to the acquisition of Ansett Transit Industries by Air New Zealand, Ansett New Zealand was sold to News Corporation and later to Tasman Pacific Airlines of New Zealand in 2000, operating as a Qantas franchise under the Qantas New Zealand brand. It went into receivership and subsequently liquidation in 2001.

History
Ansett New Zealand was the result of Ansett Transport Industries' desire to expand into the New Zealand market, enabled by the relaxation of regulation in the aviation sector by the fourth Labour government. Ansett Transport Industries formed a partnership with two New Zealand companies, Brierley Investments and Newmans Coach Lines, the latter being a tourism company which owned the unprofitable Newmans Air. Newmans Air formed the basis for a new expanded airline, the company being Bilmans Management Ltd, operating as Ansett New Zealand. Half its shares (the maximum allowed for a foreign company) were owned by Ansett, with Brierley holding 27.5% and Newmans holding 22.5%. Subsequently, regulations were relaxed still further, and Ansett took full ownership in April 1988.

Operations started on 25 July 1987 with three Boeing 737-100 aircraft between Auckland, Wellington and Christchurch. The ex Newmans Air de Havilland Canada Dash 7s were used on tourist routes between Auckland, Rotorua, Christchurch, Mount Cook and Queenstown. The old and noisy Boeing 737 aircraft were replaced with new and quieter British Aerospace 146s known as "Whisper Jets". Routes were extended to Dunedin and Invercargill. Also the old Dash-7s were replaced with the much more fuel efficient Bombardier Dash 8s. By the year 2000 the fleet had risen to eight BAE-146s (one a quick change version to convert to freighter operations) and five Dash-8s.

During the early 1990s, Ansett New Zealand created television advertisements emphasising the airline's customer service. One advert featured a businessman (played by Peter Hambleton) who accidentally brought his cat Fluffy to the airport; the Ansett check-in attendant subsequently takes Fluffy off the businessman's hands and arranges for the cat to be taken home. The advert was voted the best by public vote in the 1992 Fair Go Ad Awards.

In 1996, Air New Zealand made a bid to purchase half of Ansett Transport Industries, after an open skies agreement for the former to fly within Australia was abruptly withdrawn. Anti-monopoly regulators did not want Air New Zealand to gain control of Ansett's operations in New Zealand, however, and it was therefore required that the two Ansett airlines would be separated. Ansett would be owned by Air New Zealand and (until it was bought out) News Corporation, while Ansett New Zealand would be owned by News Corporation exclusively.

In June 2000, News Corporation sold Ansett New Zealand to Tasman Pacific Airlines that was owned by a group of investors including RM Williams. Shortly afterwards, the company became a franchise of Qantas, operating under the Qantas New Zealand brand. The following year, however, the airline went into liquidation. Qantas's later involvement in the New Zealand domestic market was unrelated and not through a franchise agreement.

Fleet
 12 British Aerospace 146s; including 2 -200, 1 200QC, 6 300, and 3 -300A
 2 Dash 7 (inherited from Newmans Air)
 9 Bombardier Dash 8; including 7 -102 and 2 -311
 5 Boeing 737-130
 5 Embraer EMB 110 Bandeirante (operated by Rex Aviation as Tranzair and later Ansett regional scheduled services, ended by 1999 and replaced by Jetstream)
5 BAe Jetstream 32EP (operated by Rex Aviation and Air National as Ansett regional)

Destinations
Prior to the suspension of domestic passenger services, the airline (as at January 2001) operated services to the following scheduled destinations:

Accidents
 Ansett New Zealand's first accident involved a BAe 146–200 that ran off the end of the runway at Queenstown Airport on 28 April 1990. However the aircraft only suffered minor damage.
  Ansett New Zealand Flight 703 was an Ansett New Zealand scheduled passenger transport flight from Auckland to Palmerston North.  On 9 June 1995, the Dash 8 aircraft flying this route crashed west of the Tararua Ranges and 16 km east of Palmerston North Airport, during an instrument approach in bad weather. The aircraft was carrying 18 passengers and three crew members. All passengers were New Zealand citizens except for a single United States citizen. The flight attendant and three passengers died as a result of the crash.

See also
 List of defunct airlines of New Zealand
 History of aviation in New Zealand

References

External links

 
Airlines established in 1987
Airlines disestablished in 2001
Defunct airlines of New Zealand
Former Oneworld affiliate members
Former Star Alliance members
Qantas
New Zealand companies established in 1987
2001 disestablishments in New Zealand